Kath Hughes is a Welsh actress, writer and comedian. She is known for portraying the role of Coleen in the black comedy drama series After Life and for being one quarter of the comedy sketch group Gein's Family Giftshop.

Life and career
Prior to acting, Hughes worked as an assistant editor on various short films, including Shed  and Trauma, as a production co-ordinator on the film The Zombie King and as a production manager for the mini-series Legends of Old. Hughes is a member of the comedy sketch group Gein's Family Giftshop, alongside Kiri Pritchard-McLean, Adam Scott-Rowley and Edward Easton. They have created and starred in a number of short films and comedy sketches and were nominated for Best Newcomer at the Edinburgh Comedy Awards in 2014 and the Chortle Awards in 2015. Hughes also provided the voiceover for a Sour Patch Kids advert. In 2015, Hughes made her solo acting debut in the BBC black comedy series Inside No. 9, portraying a caller in the episode "Cold Comfort". Between 2016 and 2017, she appeared as various characters in the Comedy Central series Drunk History.

In 2018, Hughes portrayed Laura in an episode of the Sky Atlantic comedy Sally4Ever and Miriam in the television sitcom Zapped. In 2019, Hughes appeared as a supermarket checkout assistant in the first series of the Netflix black-comedy drama After Life. Her character was later established as Coleen, who returns as a regular character in the third series as a new hire at the Tambury Gazette. Hughes also made guest appearances in Years and Years, The End of the F***ing World and Tourist Trap before portraying Hetty in the online comedy series Content, a sitcom following the employees of a digital agency. Hughes also appeared in an episode of the Channel 4 series The Joy of Missing Out, and the short films Petrichor and Pedwar, the latter of which she co-wrote. In 2022, she had a recurring role as Jennifer in the BBC One comedy The Other One and is set to appear in the Channel 4 series Everyone Else Burns later in the year.

Filmography

References

External links
 

21st-century English actresses
21st-century English comedians
English television actresses
English stage actresses
English comedy writers
English women comedians
Living people
Year of birth missing (living people)